Aleksandra Krzos (born ) is a Polish volleyball player. She is part of the Poland women's national volleyball team.

She participated in the 2015 FIVB Volleyball World Grand Prix.
On club level she played for KPS Chemik Police in 2015.

References

External links

http://www.scoresway.com/?sport=volleyball&page=player&id=9592
http://www.cev.lu/competition-area/PlayerDetails.aspx?TeamID=10150&PlayerID=4786&ID=968
http://worldgrandprix.2016.fivb.com/en/group2/competition/teams/pol-poland/players

1989 births
Living people
Polish women's volleyball players
Place of birth missing (living people)